Musetta Vander (born Musetta van der Merwe; 26 May 1963) is a South African actress, model and dancer.

Biography
In 1991, Vander landed her first notable role, portraying Zander Tyler in seven episodes of the action-adventure TV series Super Force.

In 1997, Vander portrayed Sindel in Mortal Kombat: Annihilation.

In 1998, Vander starred as Lady Elara, one of the lead characters in the video game Dune 2000. In 2002, Vander reprised her role for the sequel, Emperor: Battle for Dune.

Vander's theater credits include The Bourgeois Gentleman and Soweto's Burning.

Vander appeared in commercials, including those for Lancôme, Sanyo, McDonald's, Diet Coke, Mercedes, Heineken and Skittles. She played Agent 24-7 for Prudential Real Estate.

Vander is featured in magazines, including a pictorial in Maxim and a cover on Details.

1999, Vander had a supporting role in Barry Sonnenfeld's film Wild Wild West portraying an assistant to Kenneth Branagh's character, Dr. Loveless.

2000, Vander played a seductive Siren in O Brother, Where Art Thou?. That same year, she had a role in The Cell alongside Jennifer Lopez.

Vander appeared in television programming, primarily science fiction and fantasy series, including Buffy the Vampire Slayer, Stargate SG-1, Star Trek: Voyager, Babylon 5, Xena: Warrior Princess, and Highlander: The Series. Later TV credits include guest appearances on NCIS, Criminal Minds: Beyond Borders, and Hawaii Five-0.

Vander played the lead character's wife in the comedy Kicking & Screaming, and co-starred in Say It in Russian. She played the lead female character in the thriller Breaking Point. Vander can also be seen in the spoof/comedy Transylmania.

Vander starred in a Christian movie called Johnny, and played the step-mother of Gattlin Griffith in the horror movie Under the Bed.

Filmography

Film

Television

Other works

Radio and podcasts 
Vander appeared on Ken Reid's TV Guidance Counselor podcast on 31 August 2016.

References

External links

 
 
 
 
 

1963 births
Living people
Actors from Durban
South African people of Dutch descent
Afrikaner people
South African film actresses
South African female models
South African television actresses